Regiment Highveld was a motorised infantry regiment of the South African Army. It formed part of the South African Army Infantry Formation. As a reserve unit, it had a status roughly equivalent to that of a present-day British Army Reserve or United States Army National Guard unit.

History

Origins
Regiment Highveld was formed in Middelburg on 1 January 1960, it also stationed a rear HQ in the town of Nelspruit.

The Regiment originally wore the infantry bokkop but the lion rampant emblem was adopted by 1965.

Role and operations
Regiment Highveld was utilized in a motorized infantry role and deployed on internal security duties on a regular basis.

Disbandment
Regiment Highveld was disbanded in 1997.

Insignia

Dress Insignia

References

Infantry regiments of South Africa
Military units and formations established in 1960